Andréa Burns (born February 21, 1971) is an American actress and singer best known for her portrayal of the hairdresser Daniela in Lin-Manuel Miranda's musical In the Heights, as Carmen in Douglas Carter Beane's The Nance, and as Mrs. Spamboni in The Electric Company.

Early life
Burns was born in Miami Beach, Florida to a Jewish father and a Venezuelan mother. She has described herself as "a Venezuelan Jewess from Miami who grew up loving Broadway." She spent many summers training at the French Woods Festival of the Performing Arts and is a graduate of Miami's New World School of the Arts.

Career
Burns began her career touring the opera houses of Europe as Maria in West Side Story when she was 18 years old. She has appeared on Broadway as Belle in Disney’s Beauty and the Beast, as Vicki Nichols in The Full Monty, as Carmen in The Nance, as Daniela in In the Heights, and as Googie Gomez in The Ritz, and she has sung concerts at Carnegie Hall. Burns appeared in the original company of Jason Robert Brown’s critically acclaimed Songs for a New World. Burns portrayed Lucille Frank in the national tour of Brown's Parade, for which she received a Touring Broadway Awards nomination for Best Actress. She was also created the role of Celeste in Saturday Night, by Stephen Sondheim, at Second Stage Theatre.

Her début solo album A Deeper Shade of Red was described by Playbill as "superb on all counts!" In 2006, "100 Stories", a single she co-wrote with her brother, music producer Mike Burns, rose to the No. 2 spot on the 2006 Billboard Hot Dance Club Play charts.

Television credits include Marvel Comics's Jessica Jones, Kevin Can Wait, Sky Dancers, Law & Order: SVU,  Rescue Me, Blue Bloods, The Electric Company (2009 TV series), and Wonder Pets. She can also be heard on the original cast recordings of In The Heights, Songs for a New World, This Ordinary Thursday – The Songs of Georgia Stitt, Saturday Night, It's Only Life, Dear Edwina, Shine!, Broadway Bound, and Broadway Musicals of 1953.

Burns starred as Lenora in the 2015 film Akron, an official selection of the Out on Film Festival 2015, and played Fausta in Steven Spielberg's 2021 film West Side Story.

Personal life
She is married to director Peter Flynn.  Their son, Hudson Flynn, is featured on the cover art of her solo album, A Deeper Shade of Red.

Stage credits
Source:

On Your Feet! (Broadway) as Gloria Fajardo (Originator)
Marquis Theatre
Original Broadway Production, 2015

On Your Feet! (Chicago) as Gloria Fajardo (Originator)
Oriental Theatre (Chicago), 2015

Smart Blonde (Pittsburgh) as Judy Holliday
City Theatre (Pittsburgh), 2014

The Nance (Broadway) as Carmen
Original Broadway Production, 2013

Next to Normal (Hangar Theatre) 2012 Diana
Ever So Humble (Hangar Theatre) 2012
Bye Bye Birdie (St. Louis)
The Muny, 2011
Rose "Rosie" Alvarez

In The Heights (Broadway)
Broadway Transfer, 2008
Daniela

The Ritz (Broadway)
Roundabout Revival, 2007
Googie Gomez (Standby)

In the Heights (Off-Broadway)
Original Off-Broadway Production, 2007
Daniela (Originator)

Cole Porter's The Pirate (Philadelphia, PA (Regional))
World Premiere, 2006
Manuela

In This House (New York)
Reading, 2006
Performer

The Full Monty (US Tour)
National Tour, 2001
Vicki Nichols

The Full Monty (Broadway)
Original Broadway Production, 2000
Vicki Nichols [Replacement]

Saturday Night (Off-Broadway)
Off-Broadway Production, 2000
Celeste

Parade  (US Tour)
US National Tour, 1999
Lucille Frank

Sail Away (Off-Broadway)
New York Concert, 1999
Nancy Foyle

Songs for a New World (Off-Off-Broadway)
Original Off-Off-Broadway Production, 1995
Performer

Beauty and the Beast (Broadway)
Original Broadway Production, 1994
Belle [Replacement][Understudy]
Townsperson, Enchanted Object [Replacement]
Townsperson, Enchanted Object [Replacement]
Enchanted Object [Replacement]
Townsperson [Replacement]

West Side Story (European Tour)
European Tour 1992–1993
Maria [Replacement][Understudy]

Recording credits
In The Heights
[Studio Cast, 2008]
Performer
A Deeper Shade Of Red
[Solo album, 2007]
This Ordinary Thursday
[The Songs of Georgia Stitt, 2007]
Performer
It's Only Life
[John Bucchino, 2006]
Performer

Fine and Dandy
[Studio Cast, 2004]
Performer

The Last Five Years
[Demo Recording, 2002]
Performer
100 Stories"-
[Studio Recording, 2002]
Performer

Saturday Night
[Original Off-Broadway Cast, 2000]
Celeste

Songs for a New World
[Original Cast Members, 1995]
Performer

Awards
 2016 Outer Critics Circle – Nominee – Best Featured Actress Musical
 2007 Drama Desk Award – Best ensemble
 2003 Joseph Jefferson Awards – Nominee, Actress in a Principal Role – Musical
 2001 Touring Broadway Awards – Nominee – Best Actress Musical

References

External links
 Official website
 
 
 Lortel Off-Broadway Database listing

American women singers
American stage actresses
American television actresses
American musical theatre actresses
Living people
1971 births
People from Miami Beach, Florida
American people of Venezuelan descent
21st-century American women